Kishore Bharati Krirangan (commonly known as both Jadavpur Stadium and Santoshpur Stadium) is a multi-purpose stadium in Kolkata, India, used mainly for football matches. The capacity of the stadium is 12,000 and the size of the sports complex is 13 acres. The stadium currently plays host to lower division Calcutta Football League matches. It has occasionally hosted Calcutta Premier Division matches. Sports meet of different schools are also held here.

History
Kishore Bharati Stadium was reopened on 7 February 2021 after a brief renovation by the Government of West Bengal. Chief minister Mamata Banerjee inaugurated it on the occasion of the 2020–21 I-League. The stadium hosted its first domestic league match between Gokulam Kerala FC and Real Kashmir on the same day.

Few years ago the stadium was being used as the home ground of Tollygunge Agragami for Calcutta Football League matches.

Location
The stadium is located beside E.M. Bypass in the Survey Park area (Purba Diganta) of Santoshpur, Kolkata.

Facilities

The stadium is equipped with several facilities. The stadium can be used for football and athletic events.

A modern underground drainage system is present in the stadium. It also has practice grounds for cricket and football. There is a 100-seater dormitory accommodation facility present below the galleries. It also has facilities to host seminars, conferences and meetings. A swimming pool complex is present beside the stadium.
A martial arts training centre also operates on the premises.

See also 

 Salt Lake Stadium
 Barasat Stadium
 Kalyani Stadium
Rabindra Sarobar Stadium
Eden Gardens

References 

Sports venues in Kolkata
Football venues in West Bengal
Year of establishment missing
Tollygunge Agragami FC